Sarawan is a village in Tehsil:"Mungra Badshahpur" and belong to post:"Pawaran", in Jaunpur, Uttar Pradesh, India.

Villages in Jaunpur district